Balice  is a village in the administrative district of Gmina Zabierzów, within Kraków County, Lesser Poland Voivodeship, in southern Poland.

The village has a population of 1,200.
Balice is the home of The John Paul II International Airport.

References

Balice